Hosayn Qoli Donboli was the fourth khan of the Khoy Khanate from 1797 to 1813

References

Sources 
 

People from Khoy
Khoy Khanate
Donboli tribe